Chhutti Jashe Chhakka is a 2018 Gujarati language drama film written and directed by Durgesh Tanna and produced by Nishant Thaker. The music and score was composed by Kedar-Bhargav and the lyrics was written by Niren Bhatt and Bhargav Purohit. It stars Janki Bodiwala, Bharat Chawda, Saurabh Rajyaguru, Hemang Dave and Maulik Nayak. Avani Soni was casting director of the film.

Plot

Sachin Thakkar (Saurabh Rajyaguru) is a cricket-crazy, well-settled family man but he is discontent with his middle-class family life. After losing some money in the share market he wants to earn some quick bucks to get rid of his problems. He gets influenced by a childhood friend, Raj Nag aka Nagraj, who wants him to put his knowledge of cricket to the world of cricket betting - a seemingly easy and quick route to making a fortune. Following is a roller coaster ride into a world they had never imagined.

Cast

 Janki Bodiwala
 Saurabh Rajyaguru
 Bharat Chawda
 Arvind Vegda
 Hemang Dave
 Maulik Nayak
 Shaunak Vyas

Soundtrack

The soundtrack of Chhutti Jashe Chhakka consists of 4 songs composed by the duo Kedar-Bhargav with the lyrics being written by Niren Bhatt and Bhargav Purohit.

Release

The film was released on 22 June 2018.

References 

2018 films
Films shot in India
Films shot in Gujarat
2010s Gujarati-language films